Birthrights was a BBC2 TV series 1991–1993 about UK politics, society, and race relations from a black and Asian perspective.

Selected episodes
The 12 June 1991 episode talked to Asian and black candidates for parliament about their prospects in the coming general election, and interviewed MPs Bernie Grant and Keith Vaz on four years in parliament.

References

External links
 

1991 British television series debuts
1993 British television series endings
1990s British documentary television series
1990s British political television series
BBC television documentaries
British political television series
English-language television shows
BBC television documentaries about politics